The women's +78 kg Judo competitions at the 2014 Commonwealth Games in Glasgow, Scotland was held on 26 July at the Scottish Exhibition and Conference Centre. Judo returned to the program after last being held at the 2002 Commonwealth Games.

Results

Preliminaries

Repechages

References

W79
2014
Commonwealth 79